The Tamron SP AF 60mm F/2 Di II LD IF Macro is an interchangeable macro lens designed for Canon, Nikon and Sony crop bodies and announced by Tamron on March 24, 2009. Among its peers, it stands out by its large aperture of f/2.

References
http://www.dpreview.com/products/tamron/lenses/tamron_60_2_macro/specifications

60
Macro lenses
Camera lenses introduced in 2009